Dogasar (also Romanized as Dogāsar) is a village in Kalisham Rural District, Amarlu District, Rudbar County, Gilan Province, Iran. At the 2006 census, its population was 34, in 9 families.

References 

Populated places in Rudbar County